Steve Vagedes is a retired professional football player that played in the Arena Football League and was a multiple time college football All-American.

High school career
He played for Coldwater High School (Coldwater, Ohio) where he was 2nd-team all-Ohio at offensive end.

College career
Vagedes played for Ohio Northern University where he was a multiple time All-American at both punter and wide receiver.  In 1998, he was Ohio Athletic Conference receiver of the year.  During the 1999 season he led the nation (Division III) in punting with 46 punts in 13 games for an average of 45.7 yards.  He also played in the 1999 Aztec Bowl all-star game.

National Football League career
During the 2000 season he was part of the Atlanta Falcons practice squad.  He spent parts of the 2001 season with the Green Bay Packers and Philadelphia Eagles.  He spent part of the 2002 season with the Oakland Raiders.

Arena Football League career
Vagedes played for the Detroit Fury of the Arena Football League during the 2002 season.

Minor league football career
Vagedes was twice assigned to the Barcelona Dragons of NFL Europe, but did not play.

He spent the 2003 and 2004 seasons with the Ohio Valley Greyhounds where he won the 2003 National Indoor Football League championship.

He spent the 2006 and 2007 seasons with the Port Huron Pirates where he won the 2006 Great Lakes Indoor Football League championship.

References

Living people
People from Coldwater, Ohio
Players of American football from Ohio
American football wide receivers
Detroit Fury players
Ohio Northern Polar Bears football players
Ohio Valley Greyhounds players
Port Huron Pirates players
Year of birth missing (living people)